Rybí is a municipality and village in Nový Jičín District in the Moravian-Silesian Region of the Czech Republic. It has about 1,200 inhabitants.

Etymology
The name is derived from the Rybí stream (literally "fish stream"), which is today called Rybský.

Geography
The municipality lies in the Moravian-Silesian Foothills on the Rybský stream.

History

Rybí was founded in 1397. According to local legends, Rybí existed already in 1241, but was destroyed by a Tatar raid.

Transport
The connection with nearby towns of Nový Jičín and Kopřivnice is provided by local bus transport.

Sport
Rybí is suitable for skiing in the winter season. There is a small ski resort with two platter ski lifts, one 200 m and second 450 m long.

Sights
The most important monument is the Church of the Finding of the Holy Cross. Other sights include two chapels that commemorate the former massive pilgrimage procession of the faithful, and glacial erratics.

References

External links

Villages in Nový Jičín District